Wheatvale is a rural locality in the Southern Downs Region, Queensland, Australia.

Geography 
The Cunningham Highway passes from east to west through the locality. The South Western railway line also passes from east to west through the locality but to the north of the highway; the town is served by the Wheatvale railway station.

The Condamine River flows through the locality.

History 
The locality takes its name from its railway station which in turn was named on 5 February 1904 by the Queensland Railways Department, after the property of James Clancy McMahon, a pioneer wheat grower in the area.

On 1 April 1896, James Clancy McMahon built and furnished a school building and also paid a teacher's salary. At the start of 1897, it became Wheatvale Provisional School with the teacher being appointed by the Queensland Public Instruction Department. However, the sale of the land on 28 February 1901 caused the school to close. In 1908 Wheatvale Provisional School reopened on a new site and became Wheatvale State School on 1 January 1909.

Education 
Wheatvale State School is a government primary (Prep-6) school for boys and girls at 4194 Leyburn-Cunningham Road. In 2016, the school had an enrolment of 53 students with 5 teachers (3 equivalent full-time) and 7 non-teaching staff (3 equivalent full-time). In 2018, the school had an enrolment of 41 students with 3 teachers and 5 non-teaching staff (3 full-time equivalent).

Amenities 
The Southern Downs Regional Council operates a mobile library service which visits the Wheatvale School on the Leyburn-Cunningham Road.

References

Further reading 
 

Southern Downs Region
Localities in Queensland